Little Dots is a live album by Frank Zappa, released in November 2016, consisting of recordings from the 1972 Petit Wazoo tour. It is the conceptual sequel to 2006's Imaginary Diseases, also featuring performances from the 1972 Petit Wazoo tour.

Track listing
All songs composed by Frank Zappa

Personnel 
Musicians
 Frank Zappa – Conductor, Guitar, Vocals
 Malcolm McNab – Trumpet
 Gary Barone – Trumpet
 Tom Malone – Tuba/Saxes/Piccolo Trumpet/Trumpet
 Earl Dumler – Woodwinds
 Glenn Ferris – Trombone
 Bruce Fowler – Trombone
 Tony Duran – Slide Guitar
 Dave Parlato – Bass
 Jim Gordon – Drums, Steel Drum
 Maury Baker – Drums, Steel Drum (“Columbia, SC”)

Production
 1972 4-Track ½-inch analog tape show masters recorded by Barry Keene
 Mix Engineers: Frank Zappa, Michael Braunstein, Kerry McNabb
 Mastering: Gavin Lurssen & Reuben Cohen at Lurssen Mastering, 2016
 Audio Transfers and Compilation by Joe Travers, UMRK 2016

References 

Frank Zappa live albums
2016 live albums
Live albums published posthumously